Roberto Gabriel Strechie (born 16 July 2000) is an Italian professional footballer born to Romanian parents who plays as a midfielder for Serie D club Este.

Club career
He made his debut for Venezia on 7 May 2017 in a game against Maceratese.

On 30 August 2019, he signed a contract with Dinamo București. He was released in January 2020. Strechie played for Dinamo only in friendly games.

On 24 January 2020, he signed a 3-year contract with Novara.

On 9 September 2020, he moved to Swiss club Chiasso.

References

External links
 

2000 births
Footballers from Venice
Living people
Italian footballers
Association football midfielders
Venezia F.C. players
S.S.D. Lucchese 1905 players
FC Dinamo București players
Novara F.C. players
FC Chiasso players
A.C. Prato players
A.C. Este players
Serie B players
Serie C players
Swiss Challenge League players
Serie D players
Italian people of Romanian descent
Italian expatriate footballers
Expatriate footballers in Romania
Italian expatriate sportspeople in Romania
Expatriate footballers in Switzerland
Italian expatriate sportspeople in Switzerland